Happy Little Submarine: 20000 Leagues under the Sea is a 2018 Chinese computer-animated adventure film directed by Shen Yu from a screenplay by Cindy McKay, Liu Qiling, Xia Tianran and Lin Gaofeng. It is the sixth film in the Happy Little Submarine film series, following Happy Little Submarine Magic Box of Time (2015). Released in China on 1 June 2018, the filmed grossed .

Premise 
Ali, Beibe and Meisha, submarines, have befriended a group of adorable sea creatures at the bottom of the ocean. After they tell Ali about a frightening legend of a mysterious sea monster that supposedly disrupted the ecological balance of the ocean, he leads an expedition team with Beibe and Meisha to find the creature and return the balance.

Voice cast 
The submarine characters are:
Fan Churong as Ali, a courageous submarine who leads the expedition to find the sea monster
Hong Haitian as Babe, who accompanies Ali on the expedition
Li Ye as Bobo, Ali's best friend who accidentally gets into the expedition with Ali and Babe

Release and box office 
By the end of its theatrical run, the film had grossed . The film was also released in South Korea on 9 June 2019, where it grossed $318,567.

Critically, the film received positive reviews, with particular praise aimed towards its strong environmental and ecological messages, plot and characters. However, on Douban, the aggregated user rating score for the film is 4.0 out of 10.

References

External links 

2018 films
2018 computer-animated films
2010s adventure films
2010s children's animated films
Chinese children's films
Chinese computer-animated films
Environmental films